The John Humphreys House, also known as Sir John Humphreys House, is a historic house museum located in Swampscott, Massachusetts.  Although it was long thought to be associated with John Humphrey, an early deputy governor of the Massachusetts Bay Colony, it was more likely built about 1700, based on architectural analysis. In 1641 Deborah Moody bought the Humphrey house (which he called Swampscott) and 900 acres when the Humphreys returned to England giving her over 1300 acres of what would become Swampscott, Massachusetts.  The house was originally located on what is now Elmwood Road (a plaque marks the site), but moved to its current location in 1891 as the Olmsted district was developed. It is currently owned by the Swampscott Historical Society.  It was listed on the National Register of Historic Places in 1990.

See also
 List of historic houses in Massachusetts
 List of the oldest buildings in Massachusetts
 National Register of Historic Places listings in Essex County, Massachusetts

References

External links

Buildings and structures in Swampscott, Massachusetts
Houses in Essex County, Massachusetts
Historic house museums in Massachusetts
Residential buildings completed in 1700
Houses on the National Register of Historic Places in Essex County, Massachusetts
British colonial architecture in the United States
Colonial architecture in Massachusetts
1700 establishments in Massachusetts
Historic district contributing properties in Massachusetts